The Immediate Geographic Region of Almenara is one of the 7 immediate geographic regions in the Intermediate Geographic Region of Teófilo Otoni, one of the 70 immediate geographic regions in the Brazilian state of Minas Gerais and one of the 509 of Brazil, created by the National Institute of Geography and Statistics (IBGE) in 2017.

Municipalities 
It comprises 14 municipalities.

 Almenara    
 Bandeira     
 Felisburgo    
 Jacinto     
 Jequitinhonha   
 Joaíma     
 Jordânia    
 Mata Verde    
 Palmópolis    
 Rio do Prado   
 Rubim    
 Salto da Divisa  
 Santa Maria do Salto    
 Santo Antônio do Jacinto

See also 

 List of Intermediate and Immediate Geographic Regions of Minas Gerais

References 

Geography of Minas Gerais